The Furama Hotel was a 33-storey hotel in Central, Hong Kong, located at 1 Connaught Road Central. The site is now occupied by the AIA Central office building.

History
The Furama Hotel was designed by Eric Cumine Associates and built for the Furama group in 18 August 1973.

Inter-Continental Hotels Ltd. assumed management in 1976, and the hotel was named Hotel Furama Inter-Continental. In 1990 the hotel was acquired by Kempinski and renamed the Hotel Furama Kempinski Hong Kong.

Lai Sun Development (LSD) acquired the hotel's parent company, Furama Hotel Enterprises, in June 1997 for HK$7 billion. This was done by acquiring a 45.42 per cent stake for $3.13 billion, and a general offer at $33.50 for each remaining shares at a total cost of $6.893 billion. To finance the acquisition, the company geared itself up heavily taking on $5 billion in bank loans and issuing bonds for more than $2 billion.

While the other Furama Group hotels were integrated into the hotels division, Lai Sun Hotels, the Furama plot was to be combined with the Ritz Carlton plot, which it already owned, for redevelopment into a prime office block. Then the Asian financial crisis struck, plunging the entire group into distress and forced asset sales.

In March 2000, LSD announced that a 65% stake in the Furama would be sold to a 50:50 joint venture between Pidemco, controlled by Temasek Holdings, and AIG for HK$1.88 billion. As part of the deal, Lai Sun would continue to operate the hotel until its redevelopment, at an annual rental of HK$145 million. AIG and CapitaLand each own 35 per cent, and Lai Sun owns 30 per cent. The Furama closed in November, and was demolished in December 2001.

References

External links

 CTBUH entry
 Corporate website, Furama Group

1973 establishments in Hong Kong
2001 disestablishments in Hong Kong
Central, Hong Kong
Defunct hotels in Hong Kong
Former skyscrapers
Demolished hotels
Hotel buildings completed in 1973
Hotels established in 1973
Hotels disestablished in 2001
Buildings and structures demolished in 2002
Skyscraper hotels in Hong Kong
Demolished buildings and structures in Hong Kong